Gavin David Featherstone is a British field hockey coach.

Featherstone coached the United States at the 1984 Olympics and South Africa at the 1996 Olympics. He joined Cornell University in 2012.

References

Alumni of Hatfield College, Durham
Alumni of Merton College, Oxford
English field hockey coaches
English male field hockey players
People educated at Kingston Grammar School
Year of birth missing (living people)
Living people
Cornell Big Red coaches
English expatriate sportspeople in the United States
Coaches at the 1984 Summer Olympics
English expatriate sportspeople in South Africa
Coaches at the 1996 Summer Olympics